Eva Haniaková (born 6 May 1954) is a Czech football coach and former player, who was a defender for the Czechoslovakia national team. At club level she represented Slavia Praha and DFC Heidenreichstein.

Playing career
Haniaková was part of the first official Czechoslovakian team in 1985 and played at the 1988 FIFA Women's Invitation Tournament.

Coaching career
Despite her long association with Slavia, Haniaková was employed as a youth team coach by rivals Sparta Prague. She also served as head coach of the Czech Republic women's national under-17 football team. In 2014 she was given the Václav Jíra Award by the Football Association of the Czech Republic.

References

External links
 
 
 

1954 births
Living people
Czech women's footballers
Women's association football defenders
SK Slavia Praha (women) players
Expatriate women's footballers in Austria
Czech expatriate sportspeople in Austria
Czech expatriate women's footballers